Roseanne's Nuts is a reality docudrama television series that features Roseanne Barr, her partner Johnny Argent and son Jake Pentland as they live on their macadamia nut and livestock farm in Hawaii.   It features celebrity guests like, Bonnie Bramlett, Michael Fishman, Phyllis Diller, and Sandra Bernhard. The series originally aired on Lifetime.  

The series premiered on July 13, 2011, with two half-hour episodes and received mixed reviews based on its first episode.  Its premiere was watched by 1.6 million viewers becoming Lifetime's fourth most-watched unscripted series launch in total viewers, adults 18–49 and adults 25–54. By its sixth week it was down to 711,000 viewers and was moved from Wednesdays to Friday nights for its final three weeks.  On September 21, 2011, Lifetime canceled the series.

Cast

Main
 Roseanne Barr
 Johnny Argent, Barr's partner
 Jake Pentland, Barr's son 
 Becky Pentland, Jake's stepmother 
 Greg Cipes, a friend of the family

Guest
 Bonnie Bramlett
 Michael Fishman
 Phyllis Diller
 Sandra Bernhard

Episodes

Production
In 2007, Barr purchased the 2,212-square-foot ranch-style house and 46-acre property sight unseen known as Hidden Hamakua Farm in Honokaa/Hamakua on the Big Island, Hawaii for $1.78 million. She moved there from Los Angeles full-time in 2010. Crew from The Oprah Winfrey Show visited Barr's house and farm as part of the February 14, 2011 episode featuring Barr.  She toured the cameras around while she picked macadamia nuts from her 2,000 trees, vegetables in her organic garden and gathered honey from a beehive. During the show she told Oprah that she was working on a reality show based on her new life as a farmer. The same day the episode aired, The Hollywood Reporter announced that Lifetime Television ordered 16 half-hour episodes produced by 3 Ball Productions/Eyeworks USA and Jake Pentland's Full Moon & High Tide Productions.

Release

Ratings
Roseanne's Nuts premiered on Lifetime Television on July 13, 2011, with two half-hour episodes. The show became Lifetime's fourth most-watched unscripted series launch in total viewers, adults 18–49 and adults 25–54. The first episode drew 1,638,000 viewers with an 18–49 Rating/Share of 0.7. The second episode retained 90% of the first episode lead-in for the key demos and was watched by 1,488,000 viewers with a Rating/Share of 0.6.

During its second week the first episode brought in 1,037,000 viewers with a Rating/Share of 0.4, a three-point decrease from the premiere. The second episode remained at a 0.4 Rating/Share with 977,000 viewers. It did the same as repeats of Pawn Stars that aired before Rosanne's Nuts, but Pawn Stars had more total viewers. During its sixth week it dropped to 711,000 viewers, losing more than half its premiere audience and scoring a 0.3 Rating/Share. The season finale brought in 629,000 viewers with a 0.2 Rating/Share.

Critical reviews
Lifetime sent only the first episode to critics in advance.  Mary McNamara of the Los Angeles Times wrote a positive review. She said, "There are no overproduced glamorous outings, no sound-track manipulated showdowns, no manufactured feuds — everyone in the pilot has the easy genial mien of friends helping out an odd but beloved neighbor. There's even a trio of local musicians providing a transitional tune", calling the result, "occasionally weird, occasionally hilarious show that is simultaneously a window into the life of an eccentric performer and a wickedly fun send-up of the genre, dating all the way to Paris Hilton and The Simple Life.  She also compared a scene in the first episode where Barr hunts wild pigs to Sarah Palin's Alaska as a spoof.

David Wiegand of the San Francisco Chronicle gave a positive review and welcomed Barr back to television.  He wrote: "She's foulmouthed, abrasive and suffers absolutely nothing gladly. Yet, as always, her own foibles crack her up as much as they do her boyfriend or visiting eldest son. The fact that she's completely unafraid to hold herself up to ridicule endears her to her audience".  He also noted that a reality show format "probably fits Barr better than, say, another sitcom [...]". He ended his review: "The wild pigs might not want to stick around, but the rest of us should be willing to give Roseanne's Nuts a shot for a few episodes, at least.  Scott D. Pierce of The Salt Lake Tribune wrote in his review, "As reality shows go, Roseanne's Nuts is pretty mild. Oh, she's bleeped a lot. And there's some blurring of nudity. (Ick.) But mostly it's just Roseanne being Roseanne on a macadamia nut farm".

Brian Lowry of Variety gave the show a negative review saying, "Like so many former primetime titans, it's perplexing to see Barr reduced to this [...]" and "Why Barr wanted to participate in this sort of "celebreality" unscripted sitcom—especially if she hates Hollywood as much as she says—is a little less obvious, especially since she professes not to need the money and, given her syndication bounty, shouldn't". David Hinckley of the Daily News gave it two out of five stars. He said, "Roseanne fans will be reassured, though not surprised, to hear that she sounds and acts exactly the same on the plantation as she did on her sitcom set".

References

External links

2010s American reality television series
2010s American drama television series
2011 American television series debuts
2011 American television series endings
American television docudramas
English-language television shows
Lifetime (TV network) original programming
Television shows set in Hawaii
Television shows filmed in Hawaii
Television series created by Roseanne Barr
Television shows set on farms